Innogy Nordsee 1-2-3 is a proposal for a large wind farm complex off Germany's coast. The project includes three wind farms: Innogy Nordsee 1 with 54 turbines, Innogy Nordsee 2 with 48 turbines, and Innogy Nordsee 3 with 60 turbines. In total, 162 wind turbines with a capacity of 6.15 megawatts (MW) will be used.

The Innogy Nordsee 1 project was originally developed by ENOVA. In 2008, it was acquired by RWE Innogy.  The construction permit for Innogy Nordsee 1 was issued on 4 April 2012. In December of 2017 Nordsee 1 began commercial operation, It is located 45 km from the shore.

See also

Wind power in Germany
List of offshore wind farms

References

External links
 Project's website
 w:de:ENOVA

Offshore wind farms in the North Sea
Proposed wind farms in Germany